Loval is a surname and may refer to:
 Loïc Loval (born 1981), French and Guadeloupean footballer
 Marie-France Loval (born 1964), French track and field athlete